Shlomo Hestrin (Hebrew שלמה הסטרין; born 1914; died 2 February 1962) was an Israeli biochemist.

Biography
Hestrin was born in 1914 in Winnipeg, Manitoba. He emigrated with his parents to then British Mandate of Palestine, now Israel, in 1932.

Awards
In 1957, Hestrin was awarded the Israel Prize, in exact sciences, jointly with his research partner David Sidney Feingold and their student Gad Avigad.

Hestrin's sister, Sara Hestrin-Lerner, was the recipient of the Israel Prize, in medical science, in 1955.

References

See also
 List of Israel Prize recipients

University of Manitoba alumni
Academic staff of the Hebrew University of Jerusalem
Israel Prize in exact science recipients
Israel Prize in exact science recipients who were biochemists
Israeli biochemists
Jewish Canadian scientists
Jews in Mandatory Palestine
20th-century Israeli Jews
Canadian emigrants to Mandatory Palestine
People from Winnipeg
1914 births
1962 deaths